During his life, Fidel Castro had a fascination with dairy products that has been described as an obsession. Due to this, he tried to develop the Cuban dairy industry, which failed in the long term. Dairy has been said to be "as integral to Cuban culture as Cohiba cigars".

Ice cream
Castro was known to eat large quantities of ice cream, and according to Gabriel Garcia Márquez, once ate between 18 and 28 scoops of it after a meal. During the American embargo against Cuba, Castro sent his ambassador to Canada to purchase and ship him 28 containers of ice cream from Howard Johnson's, which was the largest restaurant chain in the United States at the time.

In 1961, the Central Intelligence Agency tried to use Castro's love of ice cream against him. Every day at the time, Castro ordered a chocolate milkshake from the Havana Libre Hotel lunch counter. Richard Bissell Jr., the CIA deputy director for plans, offered Sam Giancana and Santo Trafficante, Jr., the heads of the Chicago and Tampa crime families, $150,000 in order to assassinate Castro. They gave a pill of botulinum toxin to a waiter with the goal of putting it in Castro's chocolate milkshake, but the pill froze to the side of the hotel's freezer and broke. This was one of over 600 failed assassination attempts on Castro by the CIA.

In 1966, Fidel Castro had a large ice cream parlor built in Havana called Coppelia. The original goal was to defy the United States and produce more flavors of ice cream than American brands by purchasing the best ice cream machines from the Netherlands and Sweden.

Cheese 
One of Fidel Castro's many dairy-themed projects was an attempt to create Camembert cheese better than France's. When the French farmer André Voisin visited Cuba in 1964, Castro gave him some Cuban Camembert. Voisin said that the cheese was "not too bad", and eventually admitted that it was "similar" to the French cheese, but refused to say that it was better than France's. This upset Castro, but Voisin pacified him by telling him that French cheese and Cuban cigars were both backed by hundreds of years of experience, and that like Cuban cigars, French cheese was the best in its category.

Cattle 

After experimenting with Cuba's ice cream and cheese industries, Fidel Castro began working on creating a milk industry. Cuba had previously only had Criollo and Zebu cattle, two breeds notable for their resistance to hot Cuban weather, but not suitable for large-scale milk production. Castro attempted to overcome this problem by ordering several thousand Holstein bulls and cows from Canada, which he tried to keep alive in air-conditioned facilities. Nearly one-third of the Holstein cattle bought died within the first few weeks, and using climate-controlled facilities for Cuba's entire dairy industry would be impossible. As a result, Castro began to breed the Holsteins with native breeds in order to produce hybrid cattle that could produce milk while also surviving Cuba's harsh tropical weather. Castro referred to these hybrids as "Tropical Holsteins".

Throughout the 1970s and 1980s, thousands of cattle died from malnutrition and poor living conditions, and their numbers were steadily decreasing. Castro did have one notable victory, however; in 1972, Ubre Blanca was born. She was highly prolific, producing 113 liters of milk in one day in 1982, as well as 24,268.9 liters in a single lactation cycle that same year. Castro loved Ubre Blanca, and made sure that she was well taken care of. She had an air-conditioned stable with music and a security detail. Castro even brought foreign dignitaries to visit the cow. Ubre Blanca was a symbol of national pride, and the communist party newspaper Granma published daily updates on her health and milk production.

Ubre Blanca's death made national news in Cuba. Granma ran a full-page obituary, and Ubre Blanca received military honors, a eulogy poem, and a marble statue in her honor. In 2002, Cuban scientists tried to clone Ubre Blanca using genetic samples taken from when she was alive.

In 1987, Castro once again asked a team of scientists to genetically engineer cattle, this time hoping to create dog-sized cows to live in people's homes and produce enough milk for each family. This idea never came to fruition.

See also 
 Agriculture in Cuba

References

Fidel Castro
Dairy